Albert Welling (born 29 February 1952) is a British actor. He has appeared in a number of television series including The Line of Beauty, Cribb, Z-Cars, The Sweeney, Rumpole of the Bailey, The Bretts, Inspector Morse and A Touch of Frost.

He made his stage debut in Zigger Zagger in 1967 with the National Youth Theatre. His film credits include Backbeat, Ricky Gervais and Stephen Merchant's directorial debut Cemetery Junction and Wilde. He portrayed Adolf Hitler in an episode of Doctor Who entitled "Let's Kill Hitler". He played Max Pruss, in the documentary Hindenburg: The Untold Story.

In 2013, Albert wrote and starred in the play No Direction alongside Ronnie Toms, premiering at the Edinburgh Festival. No Direction was directed by Bob Golding and ran for the duration of the festival at Assembly Three, George Square.

References

External links
 

1952 births
Living people
British male television actors
British male film actors
British male stage actors
20th-century British male actors
21st-century British male actors
Male actors from London